Camp Victoria was the Swedish camp where most of the Swedish soldiers in the international force in Kosovo were located. The camp was previously named Camp Gripen, but the name was changed in spring 2000. The camp is located in Hajvalia, south of Pristina.

The camp housed approximately 370 soldiers. Most of them were Swedish, but there were also Irish, Czech, Finnish and Latvian soldiers. Most of the soldiers belonged to the Swedish mechanized rifle company and the Swedish supply company. In June 2011, Camp Victoria was to be completely discontinued and KS21 was the last Swedish contingent that was operational at the camp before KS22 moved into the KFOR headquarters at Camp Film City.

Trivia
The mess at Camp Victoria was called Muddy Mess.

Camp Victoria was also the name of a Swedish camp in Larnaca, Cyprus under UNFICYP.

Notes

Swedish Army
Kosovo War